Mian Chilan (also Romanized as Mīān Chīlān; also known as Meyān Chīlāq and Mīān Chīlāq) is a village in Rudkhaneh Bar Rural District, Rudkhaneh District, Rudan County, Hormozgan Province, Iran. At the 2006 census, its population was 87, in 26 families.

References 

Populated places in Rudan County